Kolut is a village in Serbia. It is situated in the Sombor municipality, in the West Bačka District, Vojvodina province. The village has a Serb ethnic majority and its population numbering 1,710 people (2002 census).

History

It was first mentioned in 1261 under name Kulod, while in 1330 it was mentioned as Kulund, and several years later as Bel-Kulund during the administration of the medieval Kingdom of Hungary. During Ottoman administration (16th-17th century), the village of Kolut was populated by ethnic Serbs. In the 18th century, Germans and Hungarians settled here as well. After World War II, the village was settled by 436 families from Lika and Gorski Kotar.

Historical population

1961: 2,597
1971: 2,148
1981: 1,866
1991: 1,710
2002: 1,710
2010: 1,356

See also
List of places in Serbia
List of cities, towns and villages in Vojvodina

References
Slobodan Ćurčić, Broj stanovnika Vojvodine, Novi Sad, 1996.

External links 
Kolut
Kolut

Gallery

Places in Bačka
Sombor
West Bačka District